Major General Clarence Henry McNeil (July 4, 1873 – September 13, 1947) was a U.S. Army general.

Early life
Clarence Henry McNeil was born July 4, 1873 in Oxford, New York. He graduated from the United States Military Academy number eleven of seventy-three in the class of 1896.

Military career
McNeil was commissioned in the artillery stationed at Fort Slocum, New York, and was transferred to Key West Barracks, Florida, to Fort Hamilton and Fort Wadsworth, New York, back to Florida, to Washington Barracks, Washington D.C., and to Fort Hancock, New Jersey. He served for two years ad adjutant of the Field Artillery School at Fort Riley, Kansas. On September 1, 1905, he was sent to the School of Submarine Defense at Fort Totten, New York.

After the Artillery Corps split into filed and Coast Artillery, he stayed with the latter. On December 10, 1913, he was detailed to the Inspector General's Department, and from 1915 to 1918, he was with the Quartermasters Department. From April 29 to June 11, 1918, he commanded the 66th Coast Artillery Regiment. He was promoted to brigadier general after serving in the office of the Chief of Staff until October 1, 1918. He also commanded the 37th Coast Artillery Brigade (AEF) from October 21, 1918, to February 7, 1919. He commanded the South Atlantic Coast Artillery District from March 4 to June 15, 1919, and from May 15 to June 15, he also was the commanding general of the Southeastern Department.

McNeil reverted to his permanent rank of lieutenant colonel of Coast Artillery on June 15, 1919. On June 25, 1920 he was promoted to colonel of Coast Artillery. In addition, he was executive assistant to the chief of Coast Artillery for a year and four months, and he spent six months on the War Department General Staff, after which he was ordered home to await retirement. He retired on December 1, 1922.

Personal life
McNeil was an instructor of mathematics at West Point from August 21, 1899 to January 6, 1903. He also taught at the Field Artillery School after graduation until April 23, 1908. He was a student at the General Staff College from August 15, 1919 to July 1931, 1920, when he graduated. McNeil died in Berkeley, California on September 13, 1947.

References

External links
 

1873 births
1947 deaths
United States Army generals
People from Oxford, New York
United States Military Academy alumni